The 2015 Pan American Games were held in Toronto, Canada from 10 July to 26 July 2015.

Archery

Athletics

Men's events

Women's events

Badminton

Baseball

Basketball

Beach volleyball

Bowling

Boxing

Men's events

Women's events

Canoeing

Slalom

Sprint
Men

Women

Cycling

BMX

Mountain biking

Road cycling

Track cycling

Diving

Men's events

Women's events

Equestrian

Fencing

Men's events

Women's events

Field hockey

Football

Gymnastics

Artistic gymnastics

Men's events

Women's events

Rhythmic gymnastics

Individual

Group

Trampoline

Golf

Handball

Judo

Men's events

Women's events

Karate

Men's events

Women's events

Modern pentathlon

Racquetball

Men's events

Women's events

Roller sports

Figure skating

Speed skating

Rowing

Men's events

Women's events

Rugby sevens

Sailing

Men's events

Women's events

Open events

Shooting

Men's events

Women's events

Softball

Squash

Men's events

Women's events

Swimming

Men's events

* Swimmers who participated in the heats only and received medals.

Women's events

* Swimmers who swam in preliminary heats and received medals.

Synchronized swimming

Table tennis

Taekwondo

Men's events

Women's events

Tennis

Triathlon

Volleyball

Water polo

Water skiing

Men's events

Women's events

Weightlifting

Men's events

Women's events

Wrestling

Men's events
Freestyle

Greco-Roman

Women's events
Freestyle

References

Medalists
2015